The  was a Japanese domain of the Edo period. Its headquarters were located in what is now Tenri, Nara.

List of lords

Oda clan, 1615-1871 (Tozama; 10,000 koku)

Naonaga
Nagatane
Hidekazu
Hidechika
Shigezumi (Shigetoshi)
Hideyuki
Nobukata
Hidekata
Nagatsune
Hidetsura
Nobuakira
Nobushige
Nobuhiro

References
 Yanagimoto on "Edo 300 HTML" (30 Sept. 2007)

Domains of Japan